Dale T. Kushner (born June 13, 1966) is a Canadian former professional ice hockey player. He played in the National Hockey League (NHL) with the New York Islanders and Philadelphia Flyers.

Career statistics

External links
 

1966 births
Canadian ice hockey right wingers
Capital District Islanders players
Hershey Bears players
Ice hockey people from British Columbia
Living people
Medicine Hat Tigers players
Kalamazoo Wings (1974–2000) players
Moose Jaw Warriors players
New York Islanders players
People from Terrace, British Columbia
Philadelphia Flyers players
Prince Albert Raiders players
Saint John Flames players
Springfield Indians players
Undrafted National Hockey League players
Fort McMurray Oil Barons players